Song of the Year may refer to:

 Country Music Association Award for Song of the Year
 Dove Award for Song of the Year
 Golden Melody Award for Song of the Year
 Grammis Song of the Year
 Grammy Award for Song of the Year
 Latin Grammy Award for Song of the Year
 Mnet Asian Music Award for Song of the Year
 MTV Video Music Award for Song of the Year
 Song of the Year (Russia), Soviet and Russian festival and award
 Soul Train Music Award for Best Song of the Year
 WAM Song of the Year

See also 

 MTV Video Music Award for Video of the Year
 Single of the Year (disambiguation)